Tuo Zhen (born 9 September 1959) is a Chinese official, serving the Chief Editor and President of the People's Daily, an official newspaper of the CPC since April 2018. From July 2015 to March 2018 he as the deputy head of the Propaganda Department of the Communist Party of China. Tuo is the former provincial propaganda chief of Guangdong Province, during which he was widely known for his involvement in the 2013 Southern Weekly incident. He has also served as the vice-president of the state-run Xinhua News Agency.

Biography 
Tuo Zhen was born in Fangcheng County, Henan province, in 1959. His family name is extremely rare.  In 1978, Tuo Zhen was admitted to Wuhan University, majoring in political economics. After graduating from university in 1982, he was assigned to work as an editor for the Economic Daily. In 2005, he was promoted to chief editor. In 2011, he was transferred to become vice president of Xinhua News Agency. In May 2012, Tuo Zhen was transferred to Guangdong province, named a member of the provincial Party Standing Committee, and head of the Guangdong Propaganda Department.

In January 2013, it is reported that under the command of Tuo Zhen, Guangdong liberal newspaper Southern Weekly was forced to add a provided commentary glorifying the Communist Party with its annual new year editorial, which was originally intended to call for proper implementation of the country's constitution. This action provoked many Southern Weekly reporters and intellectuals (include Mao Yushi, Zhang Yihe, Li Chengpeng, Zhang Sizhi, He Weifang, Leung Man-tao, Cai Ziqiang, Jiang Mingxiu, etc.) to criticize Tuo and call for his position. Over the period of a few weeks, nearly a dozen drafts were circulated between editors and propaganda officials under Tuo; ultimately the final article had evolved to look nothing like the original draft.

In July 2015, Tuo Zhen was promoted to deputy head of the Propaganda Department of the Communist Party of China, serving as an assistant to Liu Qibao.

In April 2018, Tuo was appointed as the Chief Editor of the People's Daily, an official newspaper of the CPC. In November 2020, he was appointed President of the People's Daily, replacing Li Baoshan.

See also 
2013 Southern Weekly incident

Works

References

1959 births
Writers from Nanyang, Henan
People's Republic of China journalists
People's Republic of China politicians from Henan
Living people
Politicians from Nanyang, Henan
Wuhan University alumni
Chinese Communist Party politicians from Henan
Xinhua News Agency people
People's Daily people